De Ashton is a surname. Notable people with the surname include:

John de Ashton (disambiguation), multiple people
Ralph de Ashton (1421–1486), English officer of state under Edward IV
Robert de Ashton (died 1385), English civil, military, and naval officer
Thomas de Ashton (disambiguation), multiple people

See also
Ashton (disambiguation)